Adrian Doyle may refer to:

 Adrian Conan Doyle (1910–1970), youngest son of Sir Arthur Conan Doyle
 Adrian Leo Doyle (born 1936), Australian prelate of the Roman Catholic Church